Epicharis may be:

 Epicharis, a 1665 tragedy by Daniel Casper von Lohenstein with an eponymous heroine
 Epicharis, a tree genus now included in Dysoxylum
 Epicharis (bee), a bee genus
 Epicharis (martyr), 3rd or 4th century Christian martyrs
 Epicharis (Pisonian conspirator), member of the Pisonian conspiracy